In mathematics, and more specifically in numerical analysis, Householder's methods are a class of root-finding algorithms that are used for functions of one real variable with continuous derivatives up to some order . Each of these methods is characterized by the number , which is known as the order of the method.

These methods are named after the American mathematician Alston Scott Householder.

Method 

Householder's method is a numerical algorithm for solving the nonlinear equation . In this case, the function  has to be a function of one real variable. The method consists of a sequence of iterations

beginning with an initial guess .

, for some 

This means that the iterates converge to the zero if the initial guess is sufficiently close, and that the convergence has order .

Despite their order of convergence, these methods are not widely used because the gain in precision is not commensurate with the rise in effort for large . The Ostrowski index expresses the error reduction in the number of function evaluations instead of the iteration count.
 For general functions the derivative evaluation using the Taylor arithmetic of automatic differentiation requires the equivalent of  function evaluations.

Motivation

First approach 

Using that Taylor series we can write

We can compute its -th derivative:

Conveniently, the terms for  have vanished.  We thus get that the ratio

If  is the zero of  that is closest to  then the second factor goes to 1 as  goes to infinity and 

Second approach 

Suppose  is a simple root. Then near ,  is a meromorphic function. Suppose we have the Taylor expansion:

By König's theorem, we have:

These suggest that Householder's iteration might be a good convergent iteration. The actual proof of the convergence is also based on these ideas.

The methods of lower order 

Householder's method of order 1 is just Newton's method, since:

For Householder's method of order 2 one gets Halley's method, since the identities

and

result in

In the last line,  is the update of the Newton iteration at the point . This line was added to demonstrate where the difference to the simple Newton's method lies.

The third order method is obtained from the identity of the third order derivative of 

and has the formula

and so on.

Example 
The first problem solved by Newton with the Newton-Raphson-Simpson method was the polynomial equation . He observed that there should be a solution close to 2. Replacing  transforms the equation into
.
The Taylor series of the reciprocal function starts with

For the first orders one gets the following values after just one iteration step: For an example, in the case of the 3rd order,
.

As one can see, there are a little bit more than  correct decimal places for each order d.

Let's calculate the  values for some lowest order,

And using following relations,

 1st order; 
 2nd order; 
 3rd order;

Derivation 

An exact derivation of Householder's methods starts from the Padé approximation of order  of the function, where the approximant with linear numerator is chosen. Once this has been achieved, the update for the next approximation results from computing the unique zero of the numerator.

The Padé approximation has the form

More precisely, in any Padé approximant, the degrees of the numerator and denominator polynomials have to add to the order of the approximant. Therefore,  has to hold.

One could determine the Padé approximant starting from the Taylor polynomial of  using Euclid's algorithm. Since

.

Now, solving the last equation for the zero  of the numerator results in
.

This implies the iteration formula
.

Relation to Newton's method 
Householder's method applied to the real-valued function  is the same as Newton's method applied to the function :

with

In particular,  gives Newton's method unmodified and  gives Halley's method.

References

External links 
  Note: Use the PostScript version of this link; the website version is not compiled correctly.

Root-finding algorithms